The Hallowed and the Heathen is the second album by English band Send More Paramedics.

Track listing
 "The Hallowed" - 0:53
 "Bokor" - 2:03
 "Driven to Destruction" - 2:35
 "Desert of Skulls" - 3:50
 "Zombie Crew" - 3:46
 "No Fucking Joke" - 2:52
 "Half-Life" - 2:56
 "I Can Feel Myself Rotting" - 0:29
 "Burning the Body" - 3:30
 "A Necklace Made of Teeth" - 3:33
 "The Time Before I Turn" - 4:07
 "Cranial Blowout" - 1:56
 "Easy Meat" - 3:20
 "The Heathen" - 1:05

Send More Paramedics albums
2004 albums